The Cabinet of Israel (officially:  Memshelet Yisrael) exercises executive authority in the State of Israel. It consists of ministers who are chosen and led by the prime minister. The composition of the government must be approved by a vote of confidence in the Knesset (the Israeli parliament). Under Israeli law, the prime minister may dismiss members of the government, but must do so in writing, and new appointees must be approved by the Knesset. Most ministers lead ministries, though some are ministers without portfolio. Most ministers are members of the Knesset, though only the Prime Minister and the "designated acting prime minister" are required to be Knesset members. Some ministers are also called deputy and vice prime ministers. Unlike the designated acting prime minister, these roles have no statutory meanings. The government operates in accordance with the Basic Law. It meets on Sundays weekly in Jerusalem. There may be additional meetings if circumstances require it.

Use of terms 
The body discussed in this article is referred to in Israeli official documents as the Government of Israel. This is in accordance to the normal translation of its Hebrew name, (Memshala). In Israel, the term cabinet is generally used for the State-Security Cabinet ( HaKabinet haMedini-Bitachoni), a smaller forum of cabinet members that decides on defense and foreign policy issues and may consist of up to half of the (full) cabinet members. Another term in use is the Kitchen Cabinet (HaMitbahon, lit. "The kitchenette"), a collection of senior officials, or unofficial advisers to the Security Cabinet of Israel.

Provisional and first governments of Israel

The first government was the provisional government of Israel (HaMemshala HaZmanit) which governed from shortly before independence until the formation of the first formal government in March 1949 following the first Knesset elections in January that year. It was formed as the People's Administration (Minhelet HaAm) on 12 April 1948, in preparation for independence just over a month later. All its thirteen members were taken from Moetzet HaAm, the temporary legislative body set up at the same time.

Current government
The thirty-seventh government of Israel is the current government of Israel, which was sworn in on 29 December 2022.

See also
 Basic Law: The Government
 Israeli system of government
 List of female cabinet ministers of Israel

References

External links
 Current and past cabinets – Knesset website 
 Basic Law: The Government (2001) – Israeli Ministry of Foreign Affairs 

 
 
Executive branch of the government of Israel
Government of Israel
Lists of government ministers of Israel
Israel